The 2020–21 Kategoria Superiore was the 82nd official season, or 85th season of top-tier football in Albania (including three unofficial championships during World War II) and the 21st season under the name Kategoria Superiore. The season ended on 26 May 2021. It was initially planned to begin on 12 September 2020 but it was delayed after all participating clubs decided to boycott the competition, until the government would meet their demands. After 2 months of negotiations, the clubs ended the boycott and agreed to begin the season on 4 November 2020. Teuta won the league title on 26 May 2021, on the final matchday.

The winners of this season's Kategoria Superiore earned a place in the first qualifying round of the 2021-22 Champions League, with the second and third placed clubs earning a place in the first qualifying round of the 2021-22 Europa Conference League.

Teams
Two clubs have earned promotion from the Kategoria e Parë, Apolonia and Kastrioti. Flamurtari and  Luftëtari were relegated to Kategoria e Parë at the conclusion of last season.

Locations

Stadiums

Personnel and kits

Note: Flags indicate national team as has been defined under FIFA eligibility rules. Players and Managers may hold more than one non-FIFA nationality.

Managerial changes

League table

Results
Clubs will play each other four times for a total of 36 matches each.

First half of season

Second half of season

Relegation play-off

Both clubs remained in their respective leagues.

Season statistics

Scoring

Top scorers

Discipline

Player 
 Most yellow cards: 15
 Indrit Prodani (Kastrioti)

 Most red cards: 2
 Kyrian Nwabueze (Laçi)

Awards

Annual awards 

Source:

See also
 Kategoria Superiore

Notes and references

Notes

References

External links
 
Kategoria Superiore at uefa.com

2020-21
Albania
1